Xenolechia is a genus of moth in the family Gelechiidae.

Species
Xenolechia aethiops (Humphreys & Westwood, 1845)
Xenolechia basistrigella (Zeller, 1873)
Xenolechia ceanothiae Priest, 2014
Xenolechia ceanothiella (Braun, 1921)
Xenolechia lindae Huemer & Karsholt, 1999
Xenolechia ontariensis Keifer, 1933
Xenolechia pseudovulgella Huemer & Karsholt, 1999
Xenolechia querciphaga Keifer, 1933
Xenolechia velatella Busck, 1907

References

External links
Xenolechia at Fauna Europaea

 
Litini
Moth genera